A new normal is a state to which an economy, society, etc. settles following a crisis, when this differs from the situation that prevailed prior to the start of the crisis. The term has been employed in relation to World War I, the September 11 attacks, the financial crisis of 2007–2008, the aftermath of the 2008–2012 global recession, the COVID-19 pandemic and other events.

Usage history

World War I
In 1918, Henry A. Wise Wood posted a dilemma,

Dot-com bubble 
The phrase was extensively used by Roger McNamee in his 2003 interview to Fast Company while describing the new normal in technology development in regards to business and finance after the dot-com bubble bust,

2005 avian influenza
The phrase was used in 2005 by Peter M. Sandman and Jody Lanard in relation to methods of manipulation of attitudes of the public towards avian influenza. They explained that the initial, typically temporary, fearfulness of a novel risk such as a flu pandemic is something to be guided, that this initial period is a "teachable moment" and offers the opportunity of establishing a "new normal".

2008 financial crisis
The phrase was used in the context of cautioning the belief of economists and policy makers that industrial economies would revert to their most recent means post the 2007–2008 financial crisis.

The 29 January 2009, Philadelphia City Paper quoted Paul Glover referring to the need for "new normals" in community development, when introducing his cover story "Prepare for the Best".

The 2010 Per Jacobsson lecture delivered by Mohamed A. El-Erian at the International Monetary Fund, was titled "Navigating the New Normal in Industrial Countries". In the lecture El-Erian stated that "Our use of the term was an attempt to move the discussion beyond the notion that the crisis was a mere flesh wound...instead the crisis cut to the bone. It was the inevitable result of an extraordinary, multiyear period which was anything but normal". El-Erian's lecture cites a 18 May 2008 Bloomberg News article written by journalists Rich Miller and Matthew Benjamin for first using the term: "Post-Subprime Economy Means Subpar Growth as New Normal in U.S."

The phrase has subsequently been used by ABC News, BBC News, the New York Times, and formed part of a question by Candy Crowley, the moderator of the Second U.S. presidential debate of 2012.

2012 China's economic slowdown
Since 2012, China's economy has shown a marked slowdown, with growth rates declining from double digit levels (before the 2007-2009 financial crisis) to around 7% in 2014. In 2014, a statement by Xi Jinping, General Secretary of the Chinese Communist Party, indicated that China was entering a 'new normal'. This term was subsequently popularised by the press and came to refer to expectations of 7% growth rates in China for the foreseeable future. It was indicative of the Chinese government's anticipation of moderate but perhaps more stable economic growth in the medium-to-long term.

COVID-19 pandemic
During the earlier parts of the COVID-19 pandemic, the term new normal was used to refer to changes in human behavior during the pandemic or speculated changes after the pandemic.

In May 2020, physicians at the University of Kansas Health System predicted that daily life for most people would change during the pandemic after the lifting of lockdowns. This would include limiting person-to-person contact, like handshakes and hugs, as well as maintaining distance from others, known as social distancing. They predicted things would change again after vaccines became available.

In Austria, Chancellor Sebastian Kurz incorporated the term into his rhetoric typically based on a few catchy buzzwords from mid-April 2020, establishing it as a new political buzzword. The Austrian media reacted critically to this, questioning whether this was intended to convey a permanent erosion of civil liberties.

Criticism
Some commentators objected of overuse and misuse of the phrase by the media while describing atypical situations or behaviors, which turned it into a cliché.

In popular culture
Robert A. Heinlein used the phrase in his 1966 novel The Moon Is a Harsh Mistress, with a character telling lunar colonists:
The New Normal is an American sitcom that aired on NBC from September 10, 2012, to April 2, 2013.
A dramedy produced by Nigerian filmmaker Teniola  Olatoni Ojigbede in 2020.

See also
 Return to normalcy, also concerned with trying to emerge from abnormal periods

References

Further reading
 Assessing the New Normal: Liberty and Security for the Post-September 11 United States. Lawyers Committee for Human Rights, 2003
 Briscoe, Jill. The New Normal: Living a Fear-Free Life in a Fear-Driven World, Muptnomah Publishers, 2005.
 Etzioni, Amitai. The New Normal: Finding a Balance between Individual Rights and the Common Good. New Brunswick, New Jersey: Transaction Publishers, 2015. 
 McNamee, Roger, and David Diamond. The New Normal: Great Opportunities in a Time of Great Risk. New York: Portfolio, 2004.
 Porter, Suzanne. After 911 in the 'New'-Normal: Who Are We? Why Are We Here? Where Are We Going?. Author House, 2003
 Taylor, Vickie. The New Normal: How FDNY Firefighters are Rising to the Challenge of Life After September 11. Counseling Service Unit of the FDNY, 2002

External links

 Our new normal, in pictures, CNN, November 23, 2020
 The New Normal?, 7-country report drawing from a survey of 14,000 people on the impacts of COVID-19 on trust, social cohesion, democracy and expectations for an uncertain future in the United States, the United Kingdom, France, Germany, Italy, the Netherlands and Poland.

Business cycle
Great Recession
2010s economic history
2020s economic history
Economic impact of the COVID-19 pandemic